Waldo Silva Algüe (born 1820–10 November 1892) was a Chilean politician and lawyer who served as President of the Senate of Chile.

External links
 BCN Profile

1820 births
1892 deaths
People from Santiago
National Party (Chile, 1857) politicians
Presidents of the Chamber of Deputies of Chile
Deputies of the X Legislative Period of the National Congress of Chile
Deputies of the XII Legislative Period of the National Congress of Chile
Deputies of the XIII Legislative Period of the National Congress of Chile
Deputies of the XIV Legislative Period of the National Congress of Chile
Presidents of the Senate of Chile
Senators of the XXIII Legislative Period of the National Congress of Chile
University of Chile alumni
People of the Chilean Civil War of 1891 (Congresistas)